Harth-Pöllnitz is a municipality in the district of Greiz, in Thuringia, Germany.

References

Municipalities in Thuringia
Greiz (district)
Grand Duchy of Saxe-Weimar-Eisenach